Mohegan Colony was an intentional community based on New York's Lake Mohegan in Westchester County from 1923 to the 1950s.

Further reading 

 
 
 
 

1923 establishments in New York (state)
Anarchism in New York (state)
Anarchist intentional communities
Historic Jewish communities in the United States
Intentional communities in New York (state)
Jewish anarchism
Jews and Judaism in Westchester County, New York